Patrick McGowan (born 4 August 1959) was a Scottish footballer who played for Airdrie and Dumbarton.

References

1959 births
Scottish footballers
Dumbarton F.C. players
Airdrieonians F.C. (1878) players
Scottish Football League players
Living people
Association football inside forwards